Shree Dadiji Mandir Trust Prabhavati Public School, also known as SDMT Prabhavati Public School and S.D.M.T.P.P.S., is an Indian school located in Manigaon, Odisha.

History 
The school was founded in 1988 by Sri. G.V. Raman in honor of her sister Smt. Prabhavati.  It was started with the aim of providing affordable education to the population of this rural area.

In 1996, the school was taken over by the Shree Dadiji Mandir Trust, a not-for-profit charitable organization.

Education system 
The school follows the Central Board of Secondary Education system and has continuous tests and assignments.

Campuses 
There are two campus locations. The juniors' section (from nursery till class III) is located centrally in Titilagarh at Old Bank Chowk.

See also

 Education in Odisha
 List of schools in Odisha

References

External links 
 , the school's official website

1988 establishments in Orissa
Balangir district
Educational institutions established in 1988
Primary schools in India
High schools and secondary schools in Odisha